South Cocoa Beach is an unincorporated community between Cocoa Beach and Patrick Space Force Base, in Brevard County, Florida, USA. Subdivisions include Crescent Beach and Orlando Beach, the latter at the intersection of 35th Street and State Road A1A. South Cocoa Beach is located between the causeways of State Road 520 and State Road 404.

Surrounding areas
Cocoa Beach 
Indian River 
Atlantic Ocean 
Patrick Space Force Base

References 

Unincorporated communities in Brevard County, Florida
Populated coastal places in Florida on the Atlantic Ocean
Unincorporated communities in Florida